The Mananantanana is a river in Haute Matsiatra region, is located in eastern Madagascar. It flows into the Mangoky River. 

It has its springs in the Andringitra Massif. Together with the Matsiatra it forms the Mangoky River.

References 

Rivers of Madagascar
Rivers of Haute Matsiatra